Pseudomonas sRNA P15 is a ncRNA that was predicted using bioinformatic tools in the genome of the opportunistic pathogen Pseudomonas aeruginosa and its expression verified by northern blot analysis.

P15 is conserved across several Pseudomonas species and is consistently located upstream of a 3-deoxy-7-phosphoheptulonate synthase gene. P15 has a predicted Rho independent terminator at the 3′ end but the function of P15 is unknown.

See also

Pseudomonas sRNA P1
Pseudomonas sRNA P9
Pseudomonas sRNA P11
Pseudomonas sRNA P16
Pseudomonas sRNA P24
Pseudomonas sRNA P26

References

External links
 

Non-coding RNA